Lost River Township is one of six townships in Martin County, Indiana, United States. As of the 2010 census, its population was 572 and it contained 265 housing units.

Geography

Unincorporated towns
 Rusk at 
 Windom at 
 Yenne at 
(This list is based on USGS data and may include former settlements.)

Cemeteries
The township contains these seven cemeteries: Anderson, Cornel, Emmons Ridge, Green, Jones, Simmons and Walker.

Major highways
  U.S. Route 150

School districts
 Shoals Community School Corporation

Political districts
 Indiana's 8th congressional district
 State House District 62
 State Senate District 48

References
 
 United States Census Bureau 2008 TIGER/Line Shapefiles
 IndianaMap

External links
 Indiana Township Association
 United Township Association of Indiana
 City-Data.com page for Lost River Township

Townships in Martin County, Indiana
Townships in Indiana